La Cienega is a census-designated place (CDP) in Santa Fe County, New Mexico, United States. It is part of the Santa Fe, New Mexico, metropolitan statistical area. The population was 3,007 at the 2000 census.

La Cienega is located on the site of a Keres pueblo that took part in the 1680 Pueblo Revolt.

Geography
La Cienega is located at  (35.592537, -106.108947).

The South End of the Rockies Historical Marker, marking the southern terminus of the Rocky Mountains, is about three miles west of La Cienega.

Wetlands 

The name La Cienega refers to an important feature, a cienega (spring and associated marsh) that supplies water to El Rancho de las Golondrinas and the Santa Fe River Canyon at the foot of the Caja del Rio. The cienega itself is managed by the Santa Fe Botanical Garden as the Leonora Curtin Wetland Preserve. La Cienega is an Area of Critical Environmental Concern and has been a focus of recent efforts to create an open space corridor between Santa Fe and the Rio Grande.

Demographics

As of the census of 2000, there were 3,007 people, 1,033 households, and 761 families residing in the CDP. The population density was 225.3 people per square mile (87.0/km2). There were 1,079 housing units at an average density of 80.8 per square mile (31.2/km2). The racial makeup of the CDP was 60.86% White, 0.50% African American, 1.43% Native American, 0.30% Asian, 0.07% Pacific Islander, 31.19% from other races, and 5.65% from two or more races. Hispanic or Latino of any race were 70.80% of the population.

There were 1,033 households, out of which 44.9% had children under the age of 18 living with them, 56.1% were married couples living together, 10.5% had a female householder with no husband present, and 26.3% were non-families. 19.2% of all households were made up of individuals, and 2.2% had someone living alone who was 65 years of age or older. The average household size was 2.91 and the average family size was 3.35.

In the CDP, the population was spread out, with 31.1% under the age of 18, 8.8% from 18 to 24, 33.9% from 25 to 44, 22.0% from 45 to 64, and 4.3% who were 65 years of age or older. The median age was 32 years. For every 100 females, there were 103.9 males. For every 100 females age 18 and over, there were 104.3 males.

The median income for a household in the CDP was $38,028, and the median income for a family was $46,578. Males had a median income of $31,178 versus $30,092 for females. The per capita income for the CDP was $17,329. About 7.2% of families and 6.8% of the population were below the poverty line, including 3.3% of those under age 18 and 8.1% of those age 65 or over.

Education
It is within Santa Fe Public Schools.

The area is divided between the boundary of Nina Otero Community School (K-8) and those of Amy Biehl Elementary School and Milagro Middle School. The area is divided between Santa Fe High School and Capital High School.

Previously all of it was zoned to Capital High. In 2017 the district recommended changing the boundary of a section of the area to Santa Fe High.

References

Census-designated places in Santa Fe County, New Mexico
Census-designated places in New Mexico
Wetlands of New Mexico
Landforms of Santa Fe County, New Mexico